Karimganj is an upazila of Kishoreganj District in the Division of Dhaka, Bangladesh.

Geography
It has 43445 households and total area 200.52 km2. The area is full of greenery with water bodies surrounding the land.

Demographics
As of the 1991 Bangladesh census, Karimganj has a population of 287807(2014). Males constitute 49.75% of the population, and females 50.25%. This Upazila's eighteen up population is 109240. Karimganj has an average literacy rate of 20.3% (7+ years), and the national average of 32.4% literate. This town is famous for fried fish (chapa shutki, or Shidol). From the nation's capital, Dhaka, it is nearly 140 km away towards the north-eastern corner. Karimganj is also famous for lakes and ponds. Karimganj town is the gateway to the largest inland water body (Haors) of the country.

Administration
Karimganj Upazila is divided into Karimganj Municipality and 11 union parishads: Baragharia, Dehunda, Gundhar, Gujadia, Jafarabad, Joyka, Kadirjangal, Kiratan, Niamatpur, Noabad, and Sutarpara. The union parishads are subdivided into 85 mauzas and 186 villages.

Karimganj Municipality is subdivided into 9 wards and 17 mahallas.

Like other administrative units of Bangladesh, Karimganj also has a police station in the town. There is a health complex and a veterinary clinic in the municipality as well. The upazila complex is the center of all kinds of administrative activities mainly headed by the UNO (Upazila Executive Officer). There also lies a well equipped agricultural office, Fisheries Office, Live Stock Office, Social Welfare office. But, the most important of all is the office of the Local Government Engineering Division (LGED) which is responsible for facilitating infrastructural development in the upazila.

Mayor: Hazi abdul kaium, (Second period) from Awami League

Chairman: Saiful Islam Sumon

Vice Chairman:

Woman Vice Chairman: Roopon Raani Shorkar, from Awami League

Upazila Nirbahi Officer (UNO): Sharmin Sultana

Infrastructure
The municipal water supply is yet to be introduced in the town though all the households have their private water supply system through UNICEF-6 Hand Tube well network. Good quality water supply is available in the town. One can have 24 hours internet and 24 hours electricity facilities (in urban area), Sporting ground facilities and Boating facilities in the town. There is no private hotel to stay in the town, but, a very well furnished rest house is available in the town that can be availed by tourists and others.

Transport
The location and topography of this town has made it very accessible from any corner of Bangladesh. To come from Dhaka, there are mainly two ways. Firstly, take a BUS directly to Karimganj and Secondly, take a bus or train to come, first to Kishoreganj (the district) and then to Karimganj. Journey from Dhaka to Kishoreganj generally takes 4 hrs and it takes another only 20 minutes to reach Karimganj. Buses that leave for Kishoreganj are available form the very morning until 7 o'clock in the evening in every half an hour. But, direct buses from Dhaka to Karimganj run in every 1.5 hours. So, the latter is preferable. There are two bus stands in the capital, Dhaka, where you will find buses leaving for Kishoreganj.  The distance is around 140 km (4 hours).

Education
Among educational institutes, the Shamsunnahar-Osman Ghani Shikkha Niketon is the best. There is a Boy's & Girls' High School and a Madrasa in the municipality. Karimganj Government College is also famous for its quality education. There is no university in this small town, but, it is the only Upazila (sub-district) of the country which has a large Poly-Technique Institute কিশোরগঞ্জ পলিটেকনিক ইন্সটিটিউট in the municipality offering Diploma in Engineering including Computer Science and Engineering, Electronics Engineering and two others Subjects. For the nearest university you have to travel only 7 kilometers by BUS or by Electricity Driven Cars (approximately 20 minutes journey).

Notable residents
 M Osman Ghani, Vice Chancellor of Dhaka University, was born in Karimganj in 1912 and was elected Member of Parliament for constituency Mymensingh-21 in 1979.

See also
Upazilas of Bangladesh
Districts of Bangladesh
Divisions of Bangladesh

References

Upazilas of Kishoreganj District